John Dennis Butler (14 August 1894 – 5 January 1961) was an English footballer, who played in the Football League for Arsenal and Torquay United as a centre-half. He made one appearance for the England national team and went on to a career as a manager, with Torquay United, Crystal Palace and Colchester United in the League. He also managed Royal Daring of Belgium and coached the Belgium national team.

Football career
Born in Colombo (in what is now Sri Lanka) to English parents, Butler moved back to Britain as a child. He played for Dartford and Fulham Thursday as a youth, before signing for Fulham in 1913 and moving to Arsenal in 1914. He played in Arsenal's' reserve side in his first season, before World War I intervened. Butler duly signed up for the Royal Artillery and served in France during the war, and returned to Arsenal after the end of hostilities. By then he had come of age, and with the resumption of first-class football, he made his first-team debut for Arsenal, against Bolton Wanderers on 15 November 1919.

A tall, elegant and clean player, Butler initially played as a traditional "centre half" — i.e. as a central, deep-lying midfielder; he was in competition with Arsenal's' regular centre halves, Chris Buckley and Alex Graham, but by 1924-25, he was the undisputed first-choice centre half, playing in all but three games of the club's League campaign that season. He also won his first and only cap for England, against Belgium on 8 December 1924.

He made a total of 296 appearances for Arsenal, scoring eight goals.

After Arsenal he joined Torquay United, and stayed there for two seasons before becoming a coach at Belgian club Royal Daring, and was coach of the Belgian national side. He later had a spell as a trainer-coach at Leicester City, and the Danish national side in 1946. He later managed Torquay United, Crystal Palace and Colchester United.

He died in 1961, at the age of 66.

Honours
Arsenal
FA Cup runner-up: 1926–27

References

1894 births
1961 deaths
English footballers
England international footballers
Association football central defenders
Arsenal F.C. players
Torquay United F.C. players
English football managers
Colchester United F.C. managers
Crystal Palace F.C. managers
Torquay United F.C. managers
Belgium national football team managers
Denmark national football team managers
1938 FIFA World Cup managers
Leicester City F.C. non-playing staff
Fulham F.C. players
English expatriate football managers
Expatriate football managers in Belgium
Expatriate football managers in Denmark
English expatriate sportspeople in Belgium
English expatriate sportspeople in Denmark
British Army personnel of World War I
Royal Artillery personnel
FA Cup Final players
British people in British Ceylon